Williams v Carwardine [1833] EWHC KB J44 is an English contract law case which concerns how a contract comes about through the offer of a reward. It also raises interesting questions about the necessity of reliance on an offer in the formation of a contract.

Facts
Mrs Mary Anne Williams claimed a reward of £20 from Mr Carwardine for giving information that led to the arrest of her husband, Mr William Williams, for murdering Mr Carwardine's brother. Walter Carwardine was murdered near a pub in Hereford in March 1831, and his body was found in the River Wye in April. The plaintiff, Mrs Williams, gave evidence at the Hereford assizes against two suspects, but did not say all she knew between 13 and 19 April. The suspects were acquitted. On 25 April 1831 the victim's brother and defendant, Mr Carwardine, published a handbill, stating there would be a £20 for...

"whoever would give such information as would lead to the discovery of the murder of Walter Carwardine."

Shortly after, Mrs Williams was "beaten and bruised" by Mr Williams. Thinking she would die soon in August, 1831, and apparently to "ease her conscience", Mrs Williams gave more information which led to the conviction of her husband, Mr William Williams, and another man. She claimed the reward. Mr Carwardine refused to pay, arguing that she was not induced by the reward to give the information. At the trial her motives were examined. It was found that she knew about the reward, but that she did not give information specifically to get the reward.

Mrs Williams statement was as follows.

Judgment

Nisi prius
At the trial (nisi prius) Justice James Parke (Parke J) said,

"The motive was the state of her own feelings. My opinion is, the motive is not material."

He held that she was entitled to the reward.

Court of King's Bench

The Court, consisting of Lord Denman CJ, Littledale J and Patteson J held, that the plaintiff was entitled to recover the £20. The advertisement amounted to a general promise or contract to pay the offered reward to any person who performed the condition mentioned in it, namely, who gave the information. Two judges clearly stated that motives were irrelevant. One of two case reports read as follows.

Significance
This case has generated some controversy, because in R v Clarke the Australian High Court held that it was consistent with the proposition that "reliance" on an offer is essential for the possibility of acceptance, and therefore formation of a contract. By contrast, Littledale J suggests that if someone "knows" of an offer, this is sufficient, whatever their motive. A third possibility is that no knowledge of an offer is necessary for the formation of a binding obligation (whether contractual or not). If someone offers a reward, or makes a general offer to anyone who performs certain terms, they will be bound by their offer to the person who confers a benefit upon them. Not to do so could be regarded either as unconscionable, or lead to unjust enrichment.

See also
Carlill v Carbolic Smoke Ball Company
Shuey v United States, 92 US 73 (1875)

Notes

References
Paul Mitchell and John Phillips, 'The Contractual Nexus: Is Reliance Essential?' (2002) 22(1) Oxford Journal of Legal Studies 115-134

External links
Full text of the judgment on Bailii

English agreement case law
1833 in case law
1833 in British law
Court of King's Bench (England) cases